Alexander Bachmann  (born 17 July 1994) is a German taekwondo athlete. He won the gold medal at the 2017 World Taekwondo Championships on the Men's middleweight category.

References

External links
 

German male taekwondo practitioners
Living people
1994 births
European Taekwondo Championships medalists
World Taekwondo Championships medalists
Taekwondo practitioners at the 2020 Summer Olympics
Olympic taekwondo practitioners of Germany
21st-century German people